Dryophiops rubescens, commonly known as the red whip snake, is a snake of the colubrid family.

Geographic distribution
The snake is found in Cambodia, Indonesia, Malaysia, Singapore and Thailand.

References

Colubrids
Reptiles of Indonesia
Reptiles of Cambodia
Reptiles of Malaysia
Reptiles of Singapore
Reptiles of Thailand
Reptiles described in 1835
Taxa named by John Edward Gray
Reptiles of Borneo